KGNR (91.9 FM, "Good News Radio") is a radio station broadcasting a Christian radio format. Licensed to John Day, Oregon, United States, the station is currently owned by CSN International.

References

External links
 
 

John Day, Oregon
GNR
Radio stations established in 1993
1993 establishments in Oregon